Darren Holden (born 4 July 1972) is an Irish singer-songwriter who has performed on Broadway as part of Riverdance and Movin' Out and in the national tours for both shows. His debut album, Suddenly, released in Ireland and Europe in 1998, contained three Top 30 hit singles. He later joined the Irish folk group, the High Kings, along with Finbarr Clancy and Brian Dunphy.

Rhythm of the Dance, Riverdance and Movin' Out
Darren Holden was born in the County Kilkenny town of Mooncoin in Ireland.

Holden toured extensively with the Dublin group Boyzone from 1995 to 1997.

He joined the new Irish dance/musical Rhythm of the Dance as lead vocalist in 1999 and spent 10 months performing in Scandinavia, Germany, Hungary, Belgium and Yugoslavia. He joined the Broadway production of Riverdance in February 2000 as a featured vocalist. The show ran for 18 months and included promo slots on NBC's Today Show and CBS' Early Show.

While in New York City, New York Holden teamed with country music producer Don DiNicola and recorded an album of contemporary/traditional country tunes. Recording took place in New York as well as at OmniSound in Nashville. US country radio embraced the album, and by the end of 2003, three of the tracks had featured heavily on the airplay charts including "Blood and Smoke", which was released by Universal Records, with Miles Copeland's ARK 21 label releasing "Wherever You Are" (a number 17 hit) and "Ecstatic Electricity". Rodney Crowell once referred to Holden as an Irish Bryan White and invited him to Nashville. He co-wrote the song "Wendy's World" with Crowell.

Holden left Riverdance in June 2003 and moved back to Broadway as the lead piano man in the Billy Joel/Twyla Tharp rock musical "Movin' Out". He performed the role on Broadway for six months before originating the lead role for the US National Tour, which ran from January 2004 to January 2007. He appeared on hundreds of early morning TV and radio shows during this period including NBC, FOX, ABC and CBS. The show also performed in Toronto and Japan.

In August 2006 he released a CD called Roadworks, much of which he wrote himself. It was produced by Bryan Steele and Tommy Byrnes (Billy Joel, Stray Cats) The album was distributed by Columbia in Japan where after a huge TV and radio promotional campaign it sold in excess of 30,000 copies. The album sold a further 20,000 copies in the USA.

Holden has performed with Paul Young, Belinda Carlisle, and Bonnie Tyler. In addition, he has worked with such bands and artists as Boyzone, B*Witched, Peter Andre and Backstreet Boys. His rendition of "The Star-Spangled Banner" garnered such respect that he was invited to sing it for President George W. Bush at the White House.

The High Kings

In June 2007, Holden was invited to become a member of the High Kings, then a new Irish ballad group featuring Brian Dunphy, Finbarr Clancy and Martin Furey.

Their debut CD was released on EMI in February 2008 and hit No. 2 on the Billboard world music charts, as well as hitting the top spot on various Amazon Music charts. It reached No. 7 in their native Ireland and has since been certified platinum. There have been three sold-out tours of the US and Ireland.

Holden performed solo in March 2009 with the Kilkenny Gospel Choir, at St Mary's Cathedral, Kilkenny. He endorsed Optilase Laser Eye Clinic in a TV advertisement. In August 2009, the Sunday World and Daily Mirror newspapers reported that Slash was headhunting Holden to replace Scott Weiland as the new Velvet Revolver lead vocalist. Sources close to the LA-based group confirmed that Holden had been in talks and material had been recorded.

At the Keith Duffy Masquerade Ball on 5 December 2009 in Dublin, Holden was one of the performers, as were Aslan and Keith Barry.

Holden mentored Irish ballad group "Na Fianna" for The All Ireland Talent Show.

On 9 October 2009 Holden was one of seven Irish celebrities to spend a week in Tanzania while climbing Mount Kilimanjaro in aid of Our Lady's Children's Hospital, Crumlin. An RTÉ television documentary on the event was recorded for broadcast in 2011. The documentary was shown on RTÉ 1 television on 18 July 2011.

The High Kings album Friends for Life was released in 2013, and the opening track was a Holden original called "Oh Maggie", which became the most-played and downloaded song from the album in Ireland, the UK and particularly Germany. The album reached number 5 in the Irish Top 40, Number 3 on Billboards World Albums chart.

On 30 January 2017 at the Sunday World Entertainment Awards, the High Kings were presented with the final award of the night: "Outstanding achievement in Irish Music around the world". TV3 invited Holden back to The 6 O'Clock Show for a fourth time to discuss the award.

Holden presented some episodes of the SKY TV Channel 389 series Keep it Country which is broadcast in Ireland, the UK and the US. He interviewed some of his industry friends, as well as other singer/songwriters. Amongst the guest stars on his show were Eurovision Song Contest winner Johnny Logan and singer-songwriter Brian Kennedy.

After the High Kings played to a sold-out Drexel Hall in Kansas City, Missouri, on 8 March as part of their 2017 US tour, Kansas City Star entertainment correspondent David Freese said that Holden's vocal on "The Town I Loved so Well" was "nothing short of sensational". Standing ovations for Holden's version of this classic song continued across the USA throughout the tour, particularly in New York City on 12 March when the applause lasted more than 3 minutes according to The New York Times correspondent Jim Fuselli.

On 28 April 2017, Holden was invited to lead the panel on TV3's award-winning daytime show The Elaine Show hosted by Elaine Crowley. He was introduced as "the High Kings leader", a tag which The Evening Herald suggested "has been gaining obvious momentum and apparition in recent years" whilst reviewing the episode.

On 24 May 2017, Holden was invited to attend and present the "Student of the Year Awards" at his former secondary school "Collaiste cos Siuire" (high school) in Mooncoin. The Munster Express, Kilkenny People and Irish Times carried coverage of the event. He has now been invited back to both his former schools in Mooncoin since 2014.

On 24 August, Crashed Records rereleased Holden's "Lady", marking the 20th anniversary of its initial release in 1997. It was dedicated to the memory of Diana, Princess of Wales. Originally a top-20 single, the reaction from fans to the Holden-penned tribute and video sent it to Number 3 on iTunes, the first solo chart placing for Holden since becoming a High King.

On 2 November Holden appeared yet again on the TV3's The 6 O'Clock Show, marking his sixth appearance on the show, talking about the High Kings' new album Decade: The Best of the High Kings. The album was released on 3 November and rose to Number 1 on iTunes.

The band kicked off an Irish tour at the end of March and on 5 April Holden once again settled into the couch on TV3's The 6 O'Clock Show to chat about himself and the band. On 7 June Holden and The High Kings were nominated for Best Album at the Irish Post Awards at the INEC in Killarney. The band were joined by Phil Coulter for a live performance of their hit "Hand me down my Bible" which was written by Coulter. Holden joined him at the end of the show to play accordion on his song "Thank God this was My Life".

Charting singles 
Holden has had a number of singles in the Irish charts:
 "Don't Give Up on Us" – Ireland #23, 1997
 "More Than I Can Say" – Ireland #20, 1997
 "The Rose of Mooncoin" – Ireland #28, 1998

References

General sources 
Official website

External links 
 Official Blog of Darren Holden

Irish songwriters
Irish pianists
Living people
1972 births
Musicians from County Kilkenny
Irish accordionists
Irish mandolinists
21st-century accordionists
Male pianists
21st-century Irish male singers
21st-century pianists